Robert S. Wilson (born 1951) is an American magazine editor and author. He is the editor of The American Scholar, the literary journal of the Phi Beta Kappa Society. He took that position in 2004, after having previously been the literary editor at Civilization magazine and the editor of Preservation magazine. Wilson has also written two biographies set in nineteenth-century America, and he has edited a collection of essays from Preservation.

Biography
Wilson graduated from Washington and Lee University and received a master's degree from the University of Virginia. He worked at The Washington Post and at USA Today, where he was a book columnist as well as an editor. He was a founding literary editor at Civilization, a magazine published under the auspices of the Library of Congress. Civilization won a National Magazine Award for General Excellence in 1996. In 1996, Wilson became the editor of Preservation, the magazine of the National Trust for Historic Preservation. Under Wilson, Preservation won a National Magazine Award for General Excellence in 1998.

In 2004 Wilson briefly served as editor of the AARP Bulletin, then became the seventh editor of The American Scholar, six months after that journal had dismissed its prior editor, Anne Fadiman, in a widely publicized dispute over funding. Wilson took steps to increase the journal's focus on current events. The American Scholar writers have won a number of awards during Wilson's tenure, and the magazine has been a finalist for a National Magazine Award for General Excellence in 2009, 2012, 2014, and 2015.

Wilson lives in Manassas, Virginia, and is a member of Phi Beta Kappa.

Books
Wilson edited the 2002 book A Certain Somewhere: Writers on the Places They Remember, a collection of essays from Preservation magazine. He is the author of the 2006 book The Explorer King: Adventure, Science, and the Great Diamond Hoax; Clarence King in the Old West, about the flamboyant nineteenth century geologist Clarence King, who was the first director of the United States Geological Survey. Entertainment Weekly reviewer Paul Katz gave the book a "B+" rating and called it "an engrossing portrait". Some other reviewers were more critical, noting that the book devoted little space to the later, problematic parts of King's life.

Wilson's 2013 book, Mathew Brady: Portraits of a Nation, is a biography of the pioneer photographer Mathew Brady. Reviewers noted the difficulties of writing a biography of Brady, about whom many details are unknown. Washington Post reviewer Michael Ruane thought the book's best aspect was "its fascinating account of how the business of photography worked in the mid-19th century", and The Economist similarly commented that the book was "more a portrait of an age than of a man".

References

Living people
1951 births
People from Manassas, Virginia
Washington and Lee University alumni
University of Virginia alumni
American magazine editors
Place of birth missing (living people)